Lepiota ochrospora is a species of mushroom producing fungus in the family Agaricaceae.

Taxonomy 
It was described in 1893 by Mordecai Cubitt Cooke & George Edward Massee who classified it as Lepiota ochrospora.

Paul Heinemann suggested that this species may be synonymous with Leucocoprinus gandour however that species was found in Africa whereas Lepiota ochrospora was found in South America.

Description 
Cap: 5–15 cm wide starting ovate then expanding with an umbo. The surface is pale with dark scales which are more dense around the umbo. The cap flesh is 2 cm thick at the disc and thinner at the margin, where there are striations. Gills: Free, moderately broad and ventricose. Yellowish drying to cinnamon. Stem: 6–15 cm long tapering upwards from a bulbous base. The surface has vertical striations running up the length and the interior is hollow. The stem ring is large and movable. Spores: 8 × 6  μm. Ovate and apiculate. Ochre in colour when viewed microscopically. Smell: Pleasant. Taste: Pleasant.

The dried specimen of this species is held by The New York Botanical Garden.

Etymology 
The specific epithet ochrospora is named for the colour of the spores of this mushroom.

Habitat and distribution 
The specimens studied were found the Coast Lands of British Guiana (now Guyana) where they were found growing on the ground.

Similar species 
Cooke and Massee state that it resembles Lepiota procera (now Macrolepiota procera) but that the spores are distinctly coloured like those of Cortinarii (Cortinarius).

References 

ochrospora
Fungi described in 1893
Taxa named by Mordecai Cubitt Cooke